Frederik Raben-Levetzau (27 May 1850 – 5 May 1933) was a Danish noble and politician who was the minister of foreign affairs between 1905 and 1908. He was a landowner and had estates in Lolland and South Zealand.

Biography
Raben-Levetzau was born in Lekkende on 27 May 1850. His parents were Count Josias Raben-Levetzau (1796-1889) and Siegfriede Victorine Krogh (1823-98). In 1877 he joined the ministry of foreign affairs and worked as an attaché in Paris between 1877 and 1878 and in Vienna between 1879 and 1881. On his father's death in 1889 he took over the county of Christiansholm in Lolland.

Raben-Levetzau was appointed minister of foreign affairs in 1905. He was a supporter of the German Empire and improved the relations between Denmark and the Empire which was finalized through the sign of the Optant Convention in 1907. Raben-Levetzau held the post until 1908 when he resigned from the office. Following his resignation the cabinet also collapsed, and Raben-Levetzau retired from politics. 

Raben-Levetzau married Lillie Suzanne Moulton, an American woman, in Rome on 8 April 1886. He died in Ålholm on 5 May 1933.

References

External links

1850 births
1933 deaths
Foreign ministers of Denmark
Danish counts
People from Vordingborg Municipality
19th-century Danish diplomats
19th-century Danish nobility
20th-century Danish nobility